Georgios Lefakis (9 April 1912 – August 1976) was a Greek wrestler. He competed in the men's Greco-Roman middleweight at the 1936 Summer Olympics.

References

External links
 

1912 births
1976 deaths
Greek male sport wrestlers
Olympic wrestlers of Greece
Wrestlers at the 1936 Summer Olympics
People from Andros
Sportspeople from the South Aegean
20th-century Greek people